Legend is the fourth album from the Swedish doom metal band Witchcraft. The album was released September 25, 2012 through Nuclear Blast Records.  The album marked the debut of three new members: Simon Solomon (guitar), Tom Jondelius (guitar), and Oscar Johansson (drums).  Singer Magnus Pelander opted to focus on vocals and, as a result, Legend is the first Witchcraft album on which he does not play guitar as well as sing.  Bassist Ola Henriksson noted that "Magnus has been wanting to drop the guitar for a couple of years now, and just focus on the vocals. When we found two new guitar players, it was an easy decision for him to do that."  Critics observed that the album departed from the band's vintage production values and opted for a more modern-sounding production.

Track listing
 "Deconstruction" – 5:09
 "Flag of Fate" – 4:35
 "It's Not Because of You" – 4:13
 "An Alternative to Freedom" – 5:17
 "Ghosts House" – 4:17
 "White Light Suicide" – 5:16
 "Democracy" – 3:48
 "Dystopia" – 6:46
 "Dead End" – 12:10
 "By Your Definition" – 5:11 (Bonus track)

References

External links

2012 albums
Witchcraft (band) albums
Nuclear Blast albums
Albums produced by Jens Bogren

sv:Witchcraft (musikalbum)